Ivan K. Schuller (born 1946 in Romania) is an American condensed matter experimental physicist. He is best known for his work on superlattices. His interests are focused on thin films, nanostructures, novel materials, magnetism, and superconductivity.

The Romanian-born Schuller received his Licenciado (1970) from the University of Chile, MS degree (1972) and PhD (1976) from Northwestern University. From 1978-1987, he was a Senior Physicist and Group Leader at Argonne National Laboratory. Since 1987, he has been a Professor of Physics at the University of California, San Diego; in addition to this position, he is also Layer Leader-Materials and Devices of CAL-(IT)2 Institute, and Director-AFOSR-MURI at UCSD. He held visiting professorships at the Catholic University -Santiago, Chile; Universidad del Valle, Colombia; the Catholic University-Leuven, Belgium, and the Rheinisch-Westfälische Technische Hochschule Aachen, Germany.

Schuller is a professor of physics at UC San Diego, and the recipient of numerous prizes, including the David Adler Lectureship (2003), Alexander von Humboldt Award (2000), Wheatley Award (1999), DOE Outstanding Scientific Accomplishments (1987), a Doctor Honoris Causa at Universidad Complutense de Madrid (2005) and the 2015 Lise Meitner Lectureship Award. Schuller is a President of the Board of Trustees and Scientific Advisory Committee at the IMDEA Nanoscience Institute. Schuller was elected fellow of the American Academy of Arts and Sciences in 2018.

References
Schuller Group website
Ivan K. Schuller, "A New Class of Layered Materials", Phys. Rev. Lett. 44).

21st-century American physicists
University of Chile alumni
Northwestern University alumni
University of California, San Diego faculty
1946 births
Living people